Law of the West is a 1932 American Pre-Code Western film directed by Robert N. Bradbury starring his son Bob Steele.

Plot
Two cattle rustlers are caught in the act then branded as punishment and told if they are caught again they'll be killed. One of them, Lee Morgan, gets his revenge by kidnapping Bob, the infant son of the head cattleman, Dan Carruthers. Dan becomes a lawman in order to find his son.

Seventeen years later Bob Morgan/Carruthers is abused by Lee who he believes is his father who is pressuring him to join the other outlaws. Bob merely wants to go to California and send for his true love, Sally. Marshall Dan Carruthers rides into Outlaw Territory and the die is cast for destiny.

Cast
Bob Steele as Bob Carruthers, alias Bob Morgan
Nancy Drexel as Sally Tracy
Ed Brady as Lee Morgan
Hank Bell as Marshal Dan Carruthers
Charles West as "Dad" Tracy
Earl Dwire as Henchman Butch
Dick Dickinson as Henchman Buck Connors
Rose Plumer as Mrs. Mary Carruthers

Soundtrack 
 "Ragtime Cowboy Joe" (Written by Grant Clarke, Maurice Abrahams and Lewis F. Muir)

See also
Bob Steele filmography

External links 

1932 films
American Western (genre) films
1930s English-language films
American black-and-white films
1932 Western (genre) films
Films directed by Robert N. Bradbury
1930s American films